Marcelo Lavintman (born May 1) in an Argentine film cinematographer.

Filmography
 El Último sueño (1993)
 Pavana para un hombre descalzo (1996)
 Pizza, birra, faso (1998) a.k.a. Pizza, Beer, and Cigarettes
 Sólo por hoy (2001) a.k.a. Just for Today
 Marechal, o la batalla de los ángeles (2002)
 En ausencia (2002) a.k.a. In Absentia
 Yo no sé qué me han hecho tus ojos (2003) a.k.a. I Don't Know What Your Eyes Have Done to Me
 Ana y los otros (2003) a.k.a. Ana and the Others
 Amando a Maradona (2005) a.k.a. Loving Maradona
 Si sos brujo: una historia de tango (2005)
 Fuerza aérea sociedad anónima (2006)
 In the Eye Abides the Heart (2006)
 El Otro (2007) a.k.a. The Other

Television
 Mujeres en rojo: Pasión (2003) (TV)

External links
 
 

1963 births
Argentine cinematographers
Living people
Place of birth missing (living people)